A nocturne is a musical composition inspired by, or evocative of, night.

Nocturne may also refer to:

Art
Nocturne (painting), a visual language
Nocturne, an artwork on the Queen Elizabeth II Metro Bridge

Film
Nocturne (1946 film), an American film noir
Nocturne, a 1980 short film by Lars von Trier
Nocturne (2019 film), a Dutch drama film
Nocturne (2020 film), an American film by Zu Quirke

Music
Nocturne (band), an American metal/industrial band

Classical compositions
Nocturne (Britten), a song cycle by Benjamin Britten, 1958
Nocturne (Lysenko), an opera by Mykola Lysenko, 1912
Nocturne in E minor, Op. posth. 72 (Chopin), by Frédéric Chopin for solo piano, 1827
Nocturne in C-sharp minor, Op. posth. (Chopin), by Frédéric Chopin for solo piano, 1830
Nocturne in C minor, Op. posth. (Chopin), by Frédéric Chopin for solo piano, 1837
Nocturne in B major (Dvořák), by Antonin Dvořák for string orchestra, 1883
Nocturne for two voices and guitar H. 31, by Hector Berlioz, c. 1828
Nocturne for piano, two pieces by Georges Bizet
Nocturne for piano, 13 pieces by Gabriel Fauré

Albums
Nocturne (Charlie Haden album), 2001
Nocturne (The Human Abstract album) or the title song, 2006
Nocturne (Oliver Nelson album) or the title song, 1961
Nocturne (Wild Nothing album) or the title song, 2012
Nocturne (Siouxsie and the Banshees album), 1983
Nocturne (Yasōkyoku), by Wink, 1992
Nocturne: The Piano Album, by Vangelis, 2019
Nocturne (EP), by 2AM, 2013
The Nocturne (EP), by NU'EST, 2020

Songs
"Nocturne" (Secret Garden song), winner of Eurovision 1995
"Nocturne" (Taube song), composed by Evert Taube, 1948
"Nocturne", by Billy Joel from Cold Spring Harbor, 1971
"Nocturne", by Daft Punk from the Tron: Legacy film soundtrack, 2010
"Nocturne", by Insomnium from Since the Day It All Came Down, 2004
"Nocturne", by Medeski Martin & Wood from Combustication, 1998
"Nocturne", by Misia from Marvelous, 2001
"Nocturne", by Rush from Vapor Trails, 2002
"Nocturne", by the Sword from Used Future, 2018

Television episodes
"Nocturne" (Alias), 2005
"Nocturne" (Law & Order: Special Victims Unit), 2000
"Nocturne" (Smallville), 2002

Video games
Nocturne (video game), a 1999 survival horror game for Windows
Shin Megami Tensei III: Nocturne, a 2002 post-apocalyptic role-playing game for PlayStation 2
Nocturne, a character in League of Legends.

Other uses
Dum Diane vitrea a medieval poem also referred to as "Nocturne"
Nocturne (audio drama), a 2007 Doctor Who audio play
Nocturne (Talia Wagner), a Marvel Comics character
London Nocturne, a bicycle race
Henry Gray Turner House, or Nocturne, a historic house in Quitman, Georgia, US

See also

"Nocturn", a song by Kate Bush from Aerial, 2005
Nocturn, a Danny Phantom character
Nocturna (disambiguation)
Nocturnes (disambiguation)
Nocturno (disambiguation)
Nocturns, a set of Christian prayers
Notturno (disambiguation)